Marty Hore (born 5 March 1996) is a professional Australian rules footballer who played for the Melbourne Football Club in the Australian Football League (AFL). He was drafted by Melbourne with their fourth selection and fifty-sixth overall in the 2018 national draft. He was delisted by the Demons at the end of the 2021 season.

Statistics
 Statistics are correct to the end of the 2021 season

|- style="background-color: #EAEAEA"
! scope="row" style="text-align:center" | 2019
|
| 34 || 14 || 1 || 0 || 145 || 73 || 218 || 69 || 21 || 0.1 || 0.0 || 10.4 || 5.2 || 15.6 || 4.9 || 1.5
|-
! scope="row" style="text-align:center" | 2020
|
| 34 || 0 || – || – || – || – || – || – || – || – || – || – || – || – || – || –
|- style="background-color: #EAEAEA"
! scope="row" style="text-align:center" | 2021
|
| 34 || 0 || – || – || – || – || – || – || – || – || – || – || – || – || – || –
|- class="sortbottom"
! colspan=3| Career
! 14
! 1
! 0
! 145
! 73
! 218
! 69
! 21
! 0.1
! 0.0
! 10.4
! 5.2
! 15.6
! 4.9
! 1.5
|}

References

External links

1996 births
Living people
Melbourne Football Club players
Bendigo Pioneers players
Casey Demons players
Australian rules footballers from Victoria (Australia)